Effie is an unincorporated community located in Tallahatchie County, Mississippi.

References

Unincorporated communities in Tallahatchie County, Mississippi
Unincorporated communities in Mississippi